The  is an annual marathon road running event for non-elite men and elite and non-elite women over the classic distance of 42.195 kilometres which is held in late October in the city of Osaka, Japan. There is also a "challenge run" with a distance of 8.8km. In 2019 edition of the race, a new race course was introduced where it starts near to and finishes at the Osaka Castle Park. 

The event is jointly hosted by the Japan Association of Athletics Federations and Yomiuri Shimbun, a Japanese national newspaper. The first edition took place on October 30, 2011. In total, 27161 runners started the marathon race and of these 26175 finished the full distance.

The 2020 edition of the race was cancelled due to the coronavirus pandemic.

In 2022, an organisational change by JAAF meant the race was merged into the Lake Biwa Marathon. Race information   The elite men's race is now the Lake Biwa Marathon.

Winners 
Key:

Since merger with Lake Biwa, the elite men's race is billed as the Lake Biwa Marathon.

References

External links
 Official website

Recurring sporting events established in 2011
Marathons in Japan
Sport in Osaka
Mainichi Broadcasting System